Gyula Csinger (28 March 1905 – 19 December 1979) was a Hungarian weightlifter. He competed in the men's middleweight event at the 1936 Summer Olympics.

References

1905 births
1979 deaths
Hungarian male weightlifters
Olympic weightlifters of Hungary
Weightlifters at the 1936 Summer Olympics
People from Komárno District
Sportspeople from the Nitra Region
20th-century Hungarian people